Pankaj Choudhary is an Indian politician, author, environmentalist, and assistant professor at Delhi University's campus law Centre.

Prof. Choudhary appointed the BJP OBC Morcha's National In-charge of Research & Policy Division in 2022.

He is a directed studies fellow at The Hague Academy of International Law, a distinguished member of the International Council of Jurists, and a legislative fellow with the Bureau of Educational and Cultural Affairs.

Prof. Choudhary is the creator of the 'Let's Do It! India' non-profit, which promotes the Clean India Movement and the environment. Over the past three years, the movement has grown to include 24 states and more than 100,000 volunteers. On World Cleanup Day in September 2020, Pankaj and his NGO intended to launch a campaign in Delhi to increase public awareness of cigarette butt trash.

In 2020 Pankaj Choudhary was invited as keynote speaker at Caspian Week, World Economic Forum, at Davos, Switzerland.

His book "Female Foeticide: A Story of India’s Missing Women" which is also featured at Princeton University Library.

Awards
Pankaj Choudhary awarded with SEEP (Sustainable, Environmental, Educational Programme) 2023 from the President Of Estonia Alar Karis at the International Clean World Academy, Tallinn, Estonia.

Publications 
Female foeticide: A Story of India's Missing Women (2017) 
Pre trial : proceedings in India; 2016; Awanish Kumar, (Professor of law), Pankaj Choudhary, 
Weak Ferroelectricity and Leakage Current Behavior of Multiferroic CoCr2O4 Nanomaterials; 2019; Pankaj Choudhary, P Saxena, A Yadav, A K Sinha, V N Rai; 
Protein profiling of sickle cell versus control RBC core membrane skeletons by ICAT technology and tandem mass spectrometry; 2006; Jose Chou, Pankaj K Choudhary, Steven R Goodman, SpringerLink;

References 

Academic staff of Delhi University
Indian politicians
Indian writers
Indian environmentalists
Year of birth missing (living people)
Living people